Isaac Earl Featherston  (21 March 1813 – 19 June 1876) was a New Zealand doctor, politician, and was known for his advocacy for the establishment of New Zealand self-government, and the importance of the provincial governments.

Early life and family

He was born in Newcastle upon Tyne, England, on 21 March 1813 as son of Thomas Featherston and Jane Earl. Although he spent a significant amount of time playing sports, specifically football, as a youngster he was also quite academic and qualified in medicine at the University of Edinburgh in 1836, later at 10 December 1839 marrying Bethia Campbell Scott. He decide to leave England due to problems with tuberculosis in hope of a cure in New Zealand, leaving in December 1840. He arrived in Wellington in May 1841 on the New Zealand Company ship Olympus as surgeon-superintendent. On 1 September 1869, his third daughter, Kate, married fellow member of parliament John Cargill.

Political career

Featherston served in the first, second, third, and fourth Parliaments. He represented the Wanganui and Rangitikei electorate in the first parliament until he resigned on 9 August 1855, and then represented the City of Wellington electorate in the second, third and fourth parliaments. In 1858, he resigned his seat in Parliament and his Wellington superintendency, apparently wanting to return to England. Instead, he successfully stood for re-election in both positions within months.

Featherston was Colonial Secretary (forerunner to the modern Minister of Internal Affairs) in 1861, and a Minister without Portfolio from 1869 to 1871, having been appointed in both instances by William Fox.

Featherston was also heavily involved in the politics of Wellington Province. He was elected unopposed as the first Superintendent from 1853. He resigned from this post on 23 April 1858. He was re-elected on 28 June 1858 and held the post until 1870. His superintendence oversaw some slow growth in Wellington before in 1865 it became the capital of the colony.

From 1871 he was the first Agent-General for the colony in London, the precursor to the High Commissioner.

Wakefield–Featherston duel

A duel on 24 March 1847 was fought in Wellington between Colonel William Wakefield and Featherston (who was Wakefield's doctor) over a newspaper editorial of Featherston on the New Zealand Company land policy which questioned Wakefield's honesty. Featherston fired and missed. Then Wakefield fired into the air, saying he would not shoot a man with seven daughters.

Commemoration 

The town of Featherston in the Wairarapa is named after him, as is Featherston Street in Wellington.

References

Citations

|-

|-

|-

1813 births
1876 deaths
Burials at Bolton Street Cemetery
Members of the New Zealand House of Representatives
Members of the Cabinet of New Zealand
Members of the Wellington Provincial Council
Superintendents of New Zealand provincial councils
19th-century New Zealand medical doctors
People of the New Zealand Wars
English emigrants to New Zealand
Politicians from Newcastle upon Tyne
Alumni of the University of Edinburgh
New Zealand duellists
Recipients of the New Zealand Cross (1869)
New Zealand MPs for Wellington electorates
New Zealand MPs for North Island electorates
19th-century New Zealand politicians
Colonial Secretaries of New Zealand
High Commissioners of New Zealand to the United Kingdom
Johnston family